The Grand Rama 9 Tower, (formerly known as Rama IX Super Tower), was a proposed skyscraper in Bangkok, Thailand but has been cancelled.

See also 
 List of buildings with 100 floors or more
 List of tallest buildings and structures in the world
 List of tallest freestanding structures in the world
 List of tallest buildings in Thailand

References

Skidmore, Owings & Merrill buildings
Buildings and structures under construction in Thailand
Skyscrapers in Bangkok